Philip Friend House is a c. 1807 historic farm house in North Bethlehem Township, Pennsylvania, US.  The stone house is forty feet by thirty feet, two-story, five-bay, and gable-roofed.  Contributing outbuildings include a barn, springhouse, wash house, and privy.

It is designated as a historic residential landmark/farmstead by the Washington County History & Landmarks Foundation, and is listed on the National Register of Historic Places.

References

Houses on the National Register of Historic Places in Pennsylvania
Federal architecture in Pennsylvania
Houses completed in 1807
Houses in Washington County, Pennsylvania
National Register of Historic Places in Washington County, Pennsylvania